Deh Sukhteh or Deh-e Sukhteh may refer to:
 Deh Sukhteh, Falard, Chaharmahal and Bakhtiari Province
 Deh-e Sukhteh, Manj, Chaharmahal and Bakhtiari Province
 Deh Sukhteh, Kohgiluyeh and Boyer-Ahmad